Ber Agur (also Romanized as Ber Āgūr and Bara Goor; also known as Barāqūr, Berāgūr-e Bālā, and Berāgūr-e Pā’īn) is a village in Blukat Rural District, Rahmatabad and Blukat District, Rudbar County, Gilan Province, Iran. At the 2006 census, its population was 618, in 154 families.

References 

Populated places in Rudbar County